Gnoma pulvurea is a species of beetle in the family Cerambycidae found in Asia in countries such as Sulawesi.

Lamiini